14th CFCA Awards
February 25, 2002

Best Film: 
 Mulholland Dr. 
The 14th Chicago Film Critics Association Awards, given on 25 February 2002, honored the finest achievements in 2001 filmmaking.

Winners

Best Actor:
Gene Hackman - The Royal Tenenbaums
Best Actress:
Naomi Watts - Mulholland Drive
Best Cinematography:
The Lord of the Rings: The Fellowship of the Ring - Andrew Lesnie
Best Director:
David Lynch - Mulholland Drive
Best Film:
Mulholland Drive
Best Foreign Language Film:
Le fabuleux destin d'Amélie Poulain (Amélie), France
Best Score:
"The Lord of the Rings: The Fellowship of the Ring" - Howard Shore
Best Screenplay:
Memento - Christopher Nolan
Best Supporting Actor:
Steve Buscemi - Ghost World
Best Supporting Actress:
Cameron Diaz - Vanilla Sky
Most Promising Director:
Todd Field
Most Promising Newcomer:
Audrey Tautou

References
https://web.archive.org/web/20120515203059/http://www.chicagofilmcritics.org/index.php?option=com_content&view=article&id=48&Itemid=58

 2001
2001 film awards